Tatjana Böhm is a former German politician. She was co-founder of Unabhängiger Frauenverband (UFV).

References

1954 births
Living people
People from Chemnitz
Government ministers of East Germany